Nicola is an extinct Athabascan language formerly spoken in the Similkameen and Nicola Countries of British Columbia by the group known to linguists and ethnographers as the Nicola people, although that name in modern usage refers to an alliance of Interior Salishan bands living in the same area. Almost nothing is known of the language. The available material published by Franz Boas required only three pages. What the Nicola called themselves and their language is unknown. The Salishan-speaking Thompson language Indians who absorbed them (today's Nicola people, in part) refer to them as the  "the strangers".

So little is known of the language that beyond the fact that it is Athabascan it cannot be classified. Some linguists have suggested that it is merely a displaced dialect of Chilcotin, but the evidence is too little to allow a decision.

References

Boas, Franz (1924) Vocabulary of an Athapascan Tribe of Nicola Valley, British Columbia, International Journal of American Linguistics 3.1.36-38.
The Thompson Country, Mark Sweeten Wade

Northern Athabaskan languages
Indigenous languages of the North American Plateau
First Nations languages in Canada
Extinct languages of North America
Nicola Country